Wabaal is a 2022 Pakistani television series produced by Momina Duraid for Hum TV under banner MD Productions. It is directed by Amin Iqbal and written by Qaisra Hayat. The series stars Sarah Khan and Talha Chahour in leading roles. Wabaal's story revolves around the practice of Riba (usury) and the want for riches. The first episode of the series aired on 3 September 2022.

Plot 
Anum is an over ambitious girl who wants a super luxurious life with all fair and unfair means, this is the story of her errors of judgement that she makes in life.

Cast 
 Sarah Khan as Anum
 Talha Chahour as Faraz
 Meerub Ali as Maham
 Shagufta Ejaz as Shagufta
 Saleem Sheikh as Shakir 
 Tara Mahmood as Rahat
 Mohammad Hunbal as Naveed, Shagufta's son
 Raza Ali Abid as Gul Khan
 Sabiha Hashmi as Shakir's mother
 Kinza Malik as Faraz's mother
 Sachal Afzal as Hammad
 Hareem Sohail as Zarqa
 Salma Qadir as Zarqa's mother
 Sohail Masood as Zarqa's father
 Hira Sheikh as Farzana
 Tasneem Ansari as Shamim
 Nida Khan

Production 

In early July 2022, it was rumoured that Sarah Khan and Talha Chahour of Jo Bichar Gaye fame would play the leading roles in Amin Iqbal's directional and Qaisra Hayat's written, which was confirmed at the end of month. The first teaser of the series was released on 10 August 2022.

References

External links

Pakistani television series
Urdu-language television shows
Pakistani drama television series
2022 Pakistani television series debuts
Hum TV original programming